C-market was a Serbian supermarket chain. In the past C-market was the biggest retail chain in Serbia, today it's part of Maxi. All of the C-market stores were rebranded into "Maxi" or "Mini Maxi" after the chain was sold to Delta Holding.

C-market was a first company operating a supermarket chain in Serbia (part of Yugoslavia then). The first supermarket was opened in Belgrade, the capital of Serbia, in 1958.

References

External links
  

1971 establishments in Yugoslavia
2005 mergers and acquisitions
Defunct companies of Serbia
Delta Holding
Retail companies established in 1971
Serbian brands
Supermarkets of Serbia